Kazuya Takamiya (高宮 和也, born December 4, 1981) is a Japanese professional former baseball pitcher in Japan's Nippon Professional Baseball. He played for the Yokohama BayStars from 2006 to 2010, the Orix Buffaloes in 2011 and 2012, and for the Hanshin Tigers from 2013 to 2017.

External links

NPB.com

1981 births
Living people
People from Kishiwada, Osaka
Japanese baseball players
Nippon Professional Baseball pitchers
Yokohama BayStars players
Orix Buffaloes players
Hanshin Tigers players